The Windward Islands Federation of Labour (WIFOL) is a trade union federation on the island of Sint Maarten. It represents the majority of workers on the island and is affiliated with the International Trade Union Confederation.

References

Trade unions in Sint Maarten
International Trade Union Confederation